Metaxades is a large village and a former municipality in the Evros regional unit, East Macedonia and Thrace, Greece. Since the 2011 local government reform it is part of the municipality Didymoteicho, of which it is a municipal unit. The municipal unit has an area of 211.238 km2. In 2011 its population was 687 for the village, 717 for the community and 3,415 for the municipality.

It's a settlement where the popular form of the most characteristic industrial buildings of Thrace was created. These buildings are the koukoulospita (cocoon houses) made for housing families and hosting sericulture as a homemade activity. These residencies did not have any particularities but inside them housing was restricted and the traditional chagiati (roofed balcony) was a big hall with wooden piers. The traditional architecture of Metaxades is based on a particular way of building with carefully made wooden frameworks filled with big well assorted pieces of soft limestone -a characteristic that was preserved until the third decade of the 20th century-, with morphological unity and solid limestone constructions added to the traditional ones of the beginnings of the 20th century.

Location 
Metaxades is located in the northern part of the Evros regional unit, on the border with Bulgaria (Ivaylovgrad municipality). The river Erythropotamos flows through the municipal unit. Kyprinos lies to the north, and Didymoteicho to the east. The Greek National Road 53 (Alexandroupoli – Mega Dereio – Kyprinos – Ormenio) runs through Metaxades.

History

The village during the Byzantine Empire 
Near today's Metaxades, about two kilometers west of the village, was the old village called "Dogantzia" or "Dougantzia". Tradition has it that this was the site of the first settlement of the inhabitants of Metaxades, until 1285 when a cholera epidemic forced the inhabitants to leave the settlement, and later to look for a new place of settlement. This place was found near a young tree, a karagatsi (which was saved until a few years ago in the village square, but dried up because of the cement).

Apart from the first inhabitants of the village, families from the neighboring village of Paliouri, but also from Epirus and Cyprus came to live in Metaxades. From the first one who built his house there, Dimitrios Toukmaktis or Toukmakiotis, the village got its previous name "Toukmaki". This is what they called the hammer of the stonemasons, the craftsmen of the stone from which the so characteristic houses of the settlement are built.

The village during the Ottoman Empire 

After the founding of the village there was a "black slavery" by the Turks from 1361 who occupied Thrace until 1878 when Russia occupied us for three years. The Turks invaded Didymoteicho and occupied it in 1361 after 12 years of siege. In the same year they occupied the area from Edirne to Plovdiv. Then Sultan Murad I plundered the Thracian land mercilessly and irreparably. And this is the beginning of martyrdom. The damage is moral and material. Churches and monasteries are destroyed, wealthy merchants and landowners abandon their mansions, heavy taxes with the most painful child mass seal the humiliation of Hellenism, men are sent as slaves to the depths of Asia Minor, girls enter Harems and boys become Exiles. The barbarity of the Turks and their unheard of atrocities do not stop even in the massacres and general destruction of entire villages of Thrace.

At the same time, the Turkish government is settling refugees from the East and Pakistan (the so-called Matzirides) in the Didymoteicho area, who founded Turkish villages such as Kyani (Tsiausli), Savra (Subaskioi), Avdella, Elafochori, Polia and others. The creation of new villages resulted in the restriction of the borders of Tokmaki, the famine and the impoverishment of its inhabitants, who only knew how to work the field that was now occupied by the Turks. But they survived again, the journeys to Varna and Plovdiv began, they became transporters, later tailors, painters, linenmen. And little by little they began to buy their stolen land from the Turks.

Russia after 1878 (after sitting for three years) again handed over our parts to Turkey. According to information given to us by the manuscripts, there is an equality and generally a freedom until 1908, without problems with the Turks. 1908 is a milestone year, the beginning of difficult conditions for the Greeks. Turkey changes its Constitution and the army begins. During the First Balkan War, myriads of Thracians were killed because the Turks placed them in the front line. K. Gergenis mentions that in March 1914 the Turkish government made a general mobilization of the inhabitants from 20 to 46 years old and emptied almost the whole village of men. Most of them were killed in the battle of Cyanak Kale. Also during the First World War, the Turks recruited Thracian Greeks, who were sent on foot to the Gallipoli Peninsula, where they were harvested by the Entente allies.

In October 1913, Arvanites from Mandritsa (Μανδρίτσα) settled in the village, following a Bulgarian invasion in their home village. 

K. Gergenis mentions his personal experience, when in 1915 he saw his father, persecuted by the Turkish governor and the refugees, resorting to the forest to save his pounds. He mentions other well-to-do fellow villagers at that time, a fact that is due to their hard work, but also to their intelligence and cunning, such as Gudina, Terzoglou, Arabatzi and others.

The village during the Bulgarian occupation 
On 28 September 1915, the Bulgarians, after occupying the area of Didymoteicho, after an agreement with the Turks, in exchange for the participation of Bulgaria in the First World War, arrived in the village and lived peacefully with the inhabitants for a year. But in September 1916 they begin to show their true face. They sought by all means the Bulgarisation of the region and in addition to the atrocities they committed, they carried out other actions: they brought teachers from Bulgaria, while the Greek teachers and priests were imprisoned. They exiled Metropolitan Filaretos and threatened everyone. Of course, the mobilizations were not lacking.

From the proof is the testimony of K. Gergenis, who states that during the war of 1916–1918, when rival forces were England, France, Greece, Italy on the one hand and the alliance of the Ottoman Empire and Bulgaria on the other, in the battle that took place in Asprovalta, he served in the Bulgarian army as a soldier and fought against his compatriots.

The work of the extermination of the Hellenism of Thrace and the Bulgarisation of the region, which began by the Bulgarian komitatzides in the first decade of the century, the Bulgarians sought to complete during the First and Second Balkan Wars and the First World War, until its liberation. by the Greek army. In 1920, says K. Gergenis, we were liberated from the Bulgarians.

The village during the Greek Civil War and the Battle of Metaxades 
After the end of World War II, Greece was bloodied for almost five years by the civil strife. The villages were empty and the few who remained were old and old. The women and children went to the children's towns of the islands. The Battle of Metaxades took place in the village, that lasted three days and nights and ended with a victory for the soldiers.

1946, 6 December: The village is surrounded by guerrillas. After minor clashes with the national guards, the guerrillas arrested police officer Zikos and gendarmes Pavlos and Lambropoulos. The latter was released because he knew them. The first two were tried and convicted of treason and executed in the village square (for some at the Karagatsi tree) in front of the residents. Fear and terror prevailed in the village.

1949, 15 May: About a week ago, the surrounding area was occupied by the guerrillas and so the inhabitants of the villages of Paliouri, Polia, Avdella and Alepochori had settled in Metaxades. The soldiers knew about the guerrilla attack and did not let the farmers go to their fields. The attack began on Sunday, 15 May. The panicked villagers ran to hide in the surrounding hills, where there were many strongholds (forts hidden in dirt). Each ampri could hold 15 to 20 people.

The hill of Metaxades, which was guarded by Lieutenant Lazos and a detachment of militiamen was one of the most important in Evros. A small army was also in Asvestaria, as it was called then, but quickly fell into the hands of the guerrillas. For twenty-four hours the guerrillas were trying to occupy the hill. But the army, with the help of the inhabitants who had hidden in the foothills, repulsed them. He also used mortars and machine guns in contrast to the guerrillas, who were in possession of low-power mortars but did not know how to handle them properly. It was difficult to supply the fort with ammunition and food because the siege was suffocating. The planes that flew over the Hill for this purpose, most of the time accidentally dropped them on the guerrilla points. There were many who wanted to leave Ypsoma but were not allowed to do so by the Lieutenant, who was ordered to protect the fortress of Metaxades at all costs, not to fall into the hands of the guerrillas. So he sent a message for help. The army base was in the Protokklisi from where two Captains were sent to reinforce the fort. But access to it was very difficult. Mines were placed in all the passages. Nevertheless, they broke the siege and entered the battle with a brigade from Ladi and thus managed to defeat the guerrillas.

On 18 May, the last battle took place where the guerrillas surrendered. Most took refuge in some ravines where they were killed by airstrikes. Those who survived left Greece, followed by their families, but also by other villagers who helped them escape the army's retaliation. Slowly people began to descend into the village to see many houses burned, families torn apart and property destroyed by both the guerrillas and the army chasing anyone who helped them. In time, of course, the wounds healed, they returned to their work and their previous life.

The post-Byzantine church of Saint Athanasius 
The church of Saint Athanasius is an old Greek Orthodox church and cemetery and is located on the outskirts of the modern settlement and impresses with the humble architectural form of the dark years of Ottoman rule. It is an important religious monument for the inhabitants of the area, it opens its gate twice a year on the feast of Saint Athanasius and is made of local stones, with the architecture of the techniques of Metaxades. This particular architectural trend is found in other churches in the region of Thrace, where most of them are dug into the ground, protruding only as much as the single-storey houses of the same period, which are lit by skylights.

Specifically, the church of Saint Athanasius of Metaxades is semi-basement, introverted and no external features reveal its use as a place of religious worship. It is a rectangular house, in which the visitor enters from a ladder with a depth of 1.40m. The folklorist George Megas analyzes the reasons that justify the architectural choices in the buildings of this period, saying that the shape of the churches is a result of the fear of the inhabitants not to provoke the occupiers, as they often fell prey to the janissaries and delibasis area of Thrace with Istanbul as a springboard. He describes, in a brilliant style, the fact that Thrace is the courtyard of the Capital, to which the above invaded, causing damage and spreading terror.

Along with the post-Byzantine church of Metaxades, there is Saint Athanasius in Alepochori (1729) and Saint Pantaleon in Paliouri (~18th century), all from the same era. A significant part of his hagiographies has been destroyed by the wear and tear of time and by human interventions, according to the pastor of I.N. Prophet Elias of Metaxades, Fr. Iakovos Arnaoutidis, while the walls of the church began to recede from the roof, where water enters.

"The church is almost unknown in the scientific literature, but the cemetery, which extends to the north and east, is considered the oldest and best preserved in Evros, with the oldest inscription dating to 1691."

"It is a very important monument for the region, it must be preserved and left," said Iakovos Arnaoutidis. According to a relevant recording after a research work in 2000, the two archaeologists, Athanasios Brikas and Konstantinos Tsouris, who give detailed and important details about the four post-Byzantine churches in the area, to be dated before 1800".

Specifically for the church of Saint Athanasius in Metaxades note that "although the year of its foundation has been lost, the name of the metropolitan of Didymoteicho Jeremios is preserved, who is martyred in the years 1692–1697. What survives today from the hagiography of the church can indeed be dated to a period around 1700 ".

Evidence that confirms these dates is the icon of the Virgin Mary from the 15th century and the Cross from the 16th century, which advocate the long history of the church that connects the village with the history of Byzantine Empire. It is noteworthy that it is an indisputable presumption of religious faith and worship during the Turkish occupation with its presence reaching to the present day.

The main occupation of the inhabitants 
The main occupation of the inhabitants of the settlement is in agriculture, while a small number are engaged in the exploitation of forests and a few now in livestock, which has shown a declining trend in recent decades. There were historical periods when the settlement prospered and important arts developed, necessary for its survival, such as the art of mining, processing and carving of stone, the art of building stone houses, the art of cultivating silk from which comes the name of the settlement, the sewing of the intricate costumes of the inhabitants as well as the art of pottery with which they made the jugs and pitchers for the household and for their work.

The architecture of the village 

The main building material, stone, performs primarily an insulating function and secondarily has an aesthetic character. The appearance of the house is simple, unpretentious and its shape is always rectangular. It is airy and bright due to the sufficient number of openings it holds. Its characteristic element is the simplicity and the lack of any decorative element. Also, the balconies and the external stairs are not usual, which is also mentioned in the regulation of the building conditions of the settlement.

The main material of the masonry reinforcements is the wood that also comes from the forests of the area. The know-how of this construction has its roots in the Byzantine era and passed on to the craftsmen of the traditional houses that in this way shield the buildings against the seismic risk. The arrangement of wooden beams in the body of the masonry (timber or joists) not only interrupts the continuity of the wall by better fixing its parts, but also provides flexibility in dealing with horizontal stresses in the event of an earthquake. Similar to woodworking, we see other layouts in traditional buildings such as tractors and struts.

The construction of the roof is done with tractors and its support is carried out on wooden sleepers at the top of the walls, to avoid lateral pushings. The result is the coverage of the house with a pitched roof or more often four-pitched with a minimum slope of up to 30% and red tiles of Byzantine or Roman type. The ledge of the roof can reach up to 50 to 70 cm, according to the traditional standards of the area. This form of roof is typical of homes in Northeastern Greece, due to the frequency and height of precipitation throughout the year.

The facades of the walls are characterized by the light-colored stone bearing, with obvious wood carvings, characteristic of the architecture of the period of Ottoman rule. In rare cases the second floor was built with different materials and white plaster was used. The wall is maintained with exposed stone (dry stone) or white plaster with an iron railing.

The use of the lower floor, usually served household and commercial needs that developed in the settlement, while the space of the house is limited to the upper floor. Of the craft buildings of Thrace, the most characteristic are the hooded houses, ie houses built for the specialized mission of sericulture, in combination with the housing of the family. The most popular and simple form of such buildings is found in the villages west of Didymoteicho and towards Metaxades. Here, the external form does not differ from the common houses, as in the past in the rest of Thrace, where sericulture took place on an eco-technical scale, but in reality a much larger space is devoted to the interior. The administration and residential rooms are limited to the edge, while the traditional loggia takes on the dimensions of a large hall with wooden columns.

The construction and the form of the houses of Metaxades follow the principles of the Macedonian architecture with some local adaptations. Samples of traditional Macedonian architecture can be found in many areas of Northern Greece, Macedonia, Thrace and even Thessaly.

The main differentiation of the architecture of the Metaxades houses lies in the absence of protrusion on the second floor, which is a feature of the Macedonian architecture. The difference could be attributed to the fact that in Metaxades stone is used as the exclusive building material on both floors, resulting in heavy solid structures. Nevertheless, there are some individual exceptions, where we observe that there is a sawmill made of small pieces of stone, by-products of the processing of the stone during its formation, in the quarry. Also, another important difference, aesthetic and functional, is the simple and austere form of the houses, a fact that is attributed to the rural structure of the society and to the cold climatic conditions that prevail for a long period of the year. Characteristic is the small use of balconies and outdoor stairwells, which is also attributed to the harsh winters (strong winds, frosts, snowfall).

The orientation of the houses of the settlement of Metaxades is always east or southeast, although the settlement presents a northeast direction. It is common on the north side to miss the windows or to keep only the necessary, minimal openings, for the ventilation of the interior of the house. The house shown in Figure 5 has a southeast orientation and on the north side, although it faces the road, it retains only the necessary, small openings.

The ventilation and sunbathing of the houses is done by the windows and the doors but also the natural materials used for the construction of the houses, such as the wood and the porcelain, which have the property to breathe naturally and to create a healthy environment. The windows are made on those sides that have east and south orientation, as well as the main entrance and offer natural light throughout the year, but their number and size is not excessive. On the contrary, it is obvious to the visitor that the openings of the buildings are in harmonious balance with its overall size and height, so that it is airy and sunny, without being exposed too much to the cold of winter and the increased solar radiation of summer. The shape of the windows is simple with sliding double or triple shutters that have rafters and are protected by wooden shutters, usually paneled or nailed. Also common feature of the form are the iron rods that protect the windows of the first floor. Finally, the architectural and building form of the settlement is a living example of bioclimatic construction, where the location of the settlement, the construction of houses and building materials are directly connected with the natural environment and fit harmoniously into it, without disturbing it. Such settlements are a sample of a cohesive and sustainable housing complex, which survives without unnecessary energy consumption, while maintaining a small ecological footprint.

The local architectural idiom of Metaxades remained intact until the third decade of the 20th century, when the construction and shape of the houses underwent alterations, as it was inevitably affected by the rapid changes that took place in building materials and building methods in post-war Greece. Thus, while, for centuries, the craftsmen of the village built their houses in the traditional way and the local materials, that is, with woodwork that filled them with stone welded with mud (mud mortar) during the 1950s and 1960s also affected the settlements of Evros and the houses are made of local stone, but now welded with cement.

Modern architecture 
A little later, in the 1980s, the modern construction proposal of reinforced concrete (reinforced concrete) invades. It coincides with the period when the State was called to impose the regulation of building conditions to protect the architectural heritage of the settlement, but without the expected results. Eventually, the use of stone was limited externally, as a cladding material for exterior walls and no longer for construction.

The same malleable material (porphyry) used to build houses and cottages for many hundreds of years has given rise to other uses in building construction, such as the rendering of more learned forms and refined compact structures. Thus, constructions are built with upgraded academic rigor, in parallel with the traditional houses since the beginning of the 20th century.

Population censuses 
Important reasons for the decrease in the population of the settlement are the long distance from the main road and railway network and the administrative centers.

References

External links
Official website 
Metaxades secondary (gymnasio) and middle school (lykeiakes taxeis) home page 

Populated places in Evros (regional unit)

Villages in Greece
Evros (regional unit)
Didymoteicho